Evanivaldo Castro Silva (born April 28, 1948), also known as Cabinho, is a Brazilian-born former professional footballer who played as forward. He gained his greatest professional fame in Mexico, he is also a Mexican naturalized citizen.

Beginnings and Mexican league

Cabinho began his career at América (SP), in 1968. In 1969 Cabinho played for the popular Brazilian club Flamengo, where he played six matches and scored one goal.

Cabinho arrived in Mexico on July 19, 1974.  During his first season, despite not playing to the best of his abilities, scored a total of 16 goals.  This was just a taste prior to becoming one of the best goal scorers in Mexican soccer history, winning a total of 8 scoring titles (7 consecutively).  Throughout his stint in México, Cabinho scored a total of 312 goals.

Evanivaldo Castro was known as "Cabo" or "Cabinho" (Corporal) due to his partial taste for military camouflage clothing.

Cabinho was UNAM Pumas' maximum goal scorer in 4 seasons: 1975/76 (29), 76/77 (34), 77/78 (33), and 78/79 sharing the scoring title with Hugo Sánchez with 26 goals.

While playing for Pumas, Cabinho achieved the Mexican Championship Title for the first time in July 1977, under the management of Jorge Marik.

Cabinho played for UNAM for five consecutive seasons (1974–1979), he then went on to play for another of México City's great teams, Atlante F.C.  At Atlante, he was the maximum goal scorer of the championship three times, seasons 79/80 (30), 80/81 (29) and 81/82 (32). He scored a total of 102 goals while playing for Potros de Hierro (Iron Colts) of Atlante F.C.

His next stint was at León. With the team he reached the semi-finals in the 84-85 season, under the management of Hungarian coach Árpád Fekete.  The semi-finals were played against his old team, Pumas de la UNAM.  That year he also achieved his last Top Scorer Championship with 23 goals.

Later career
In 1986, after a one-season stint in Brazilian team Paysandu, Cabinho returned to play in México; this time he joined UANL Tigres, in the Northern city of Monterrey.  Here he played until his retirement as an active player.

In all, during his playing career in México, Cabinho played a total of 415 games with 312 goals scored; with an impressive average of 0.75 goals per game.

After the end of his playing career Cabinho took up coaching and managed México's second division team Lobos de la BUAP. He became Mexican citizen.

Honours

References

External links
List of his goals

Profile at Globo Esporte's Futpedia

1948 births
Living people
Brazilian footballers
Brazilian emigrants to Mexico
Naturalized citizens of Mexico
Liga MX players
CR Flamengo footballers
Club Universidad Nacional footballers
Atlante F.C. footballers
Paysandu Sport Club players
Tigres UANL footballers
Club León footballers
América Futebol Clube (SP) players
Associação Portuguesa de Desportos players
Clube Atlético Mineiro players
Association football forwards
Sportspeople from Salvador, Bahia